Göran Tunhammar (born 22 December 1946) was the Governor of Skåne County from 2006 to 2012. He was appointed to the position by the government on 1 July 2006. He was CEO for the Confederation of Swedish Enterprise between 2001 and 2003.

Further reading 
 http://sydsvenskan.se/skane/article154332/Naringslivsrav-tar-over-som-Skanehovding.html
 http://sydsvenskan.se/sverige/article154472/Hjartat-klappar-extra-for-Kristianstad.html
 https://archive.today/20130418095239/http://www.lst.se/lst/Om_Lansstyrelsen/addresslista_landshovdingar.htm

1946 births
Living people
Governors of Skåne County
Swedish businesspeople